JC Jacinto is a Filipino visual artist. His works have been featured in various galleries all over Manila, Philippines. While still studying at University of the Philippines, he has been qualified as a finalist in the Maningning Art Competition 2006, 39th and 40th Shell National Student’s Competition 2006 and 2007, and the PLDT Visual Art National Competition 2007.

Biography 

John Carlo Jacinto was born on February 15, 1985  in Pasig, Philippines. He graduated with a Bachelor of Fine Arts degree, major in Painting from University of the Philippines Diliman, Quezon City. He is currently residing in Cainta, Rizal.

Since 2005, John Carlo Jacinto has participated in over 30 exhibitions.

Exhibits

2006 

Liongoren Gallery

2007 

The National Museum
Prose Gallery
Diliman Fine Arts Corridor

2008 

Open at Tam-awan Village, Baguio (2008-2011)

2010 

Pulld' String2 Stop at Galerie Anna, SM Megamall
UP Diliman Film Center

2011 

In Corpo Delicto at Altro Mondo
The Private Party at Kaida Contemporary Gallery, Quezon City

2012 

The Department of Foreign Affairs

2013 

Dissecting Air at West Gallery
Strip Search at Art Galileia
Versus at Art Galilea
TENDER HOLLOW SURFACE at Galerie Anna, SM Megamall (2013-2014)

Achievements

2006 

Finalist – 39th Shell National Student’s Competition
Finalist – Maningning Art Competition

2007 

Finalist – 40th Shell National Student’s Competition
Finalist – PLDT Visual Art Competition

References 

JC Jacinto opposing strengths by Pinggot Zulueta (Manila Bulletin – 11 November 2013)
Contemporary Art by JC Jacinto by Paul Viluda (Cruzine, 5 September 2013)
 Gallery News: Pandy Aviado at The Crucible (The Philippine Star, 13 January 2014)
DFA art exhibit opens today (ABS-CBNnews.com, 27 February 2012)
Exhibition Detail

External links 
Artodyssey: Jc Jacinto Jc Jacinto
Now Gallery | Artist Now Gallery

1985 births
Living people
Filipino artists
People from Pasig
Artists from Metro Manila
People from Cainta
University of the Philippines Diliman alumni